The Paik system''' was a type of corvee labour system on which the economy of the Ahom kingdom of medieval Assam depended. In this system, adult and able males, called paiks were obligated to render service to the state and form its militia in return for a piece of land for cultivation owned by the kingdom—believed to be a legacy the Ahoms brought with them from South-Eastern Asia in 1228. But it wasn't the Ahom kingdom alone that used a corvee system like this in Northeast India—Kingdom of Manipur and in a simpler form Jaintia kingdom and the Kachari kingdom too used similar systems that had tribal origins. The mature structure was designed by Momai Tamuli Borbarua in 1608, and extensively and exhaustively implemented by 1658 during the reign of Sutamla Jayadhwaj Singha. The system continued to evolve over time to meet the needs of the Ahom state and in time began to accumulate contradictions.  By the end of the Moamoria rebellion (1769–1805) the Paik system had collapsed.

The Paik system has had a profound impact on Assam's social life, with many collective practices originating in the medieval times.  Many people in Assam today still carry the Paik offices titles in their last names—Bora, Saikia and Hazarika.

Paik system
Every male in the Ahom kingdom between the ages of fifteen and fifty who was not a noble, a priest, a high caste or a slave was a paik. The paiks were organized into four-member groups called gots. Each got had to send one member by rotation for public works. During the absence of a paik the other members of the got took care of his lands and family. In times of war, the paiks formed the militia. All lands under rice cultivation belonged to the state. Originally, the paiks were organized into phoids (clans), but by the 17th century the paiks were re-grouped into divisions called khels.  According to Guha (1991), about 90% of the population belonged to this class at the time of Rudra Singha, around 1714.  The top landed nobility landed aristocracy was about 1% and the rest constituted the servile class.

Land holdings
The duty of a paik was to render service to the Ahom state in exchange for which he was granted 2 puras (2.66 acres) of usufruct cultivable land (gaa mati), which was neither hereditary nor transferable.  In addition he could maintain his tax-free ancestral homestead and garden (basti and bari respectively).  The nobility maintained personal estates called khats.

Cultivable land called roopeet was held communally that was distributed among the paiks (called gaa mati).  Wastelands reclaimed by paiks or non-paiks not covered by a royal grant are subject to inclusion in the roopeet category to be distributed as gaa mati in the next paik survey. Surplus cultivable land was distributed as ubar mati among the paiks.

Royal service
The royal services that the paiks tended to were defense (the Ahom kingdom did not have a standing army till the beginning of 19th century and its army consisted of the militia formed of paiks), civil construction (embankments, roads, bridges, tanks, etc.), military production (boats, arrows, muskets), etc. There were two major classes of paiks: kanri paik (archer) who rendered his service as a soldier or as a laborer and chamua paik who rendered non-manual service and had a higher social standing.  Some other minor classes were: bilatiyas (tenants at the estates of nobles), dewaliyas (attached to temples and sattras) and bahatiyas (attached to hill masters).  Kanri paiks could move up to chamua.  Most of the lower paik officers—Bora, Saikia, Hazarika, Tamuli, Pachani—belonged to the chamua class.   
 
After the first major survey recorded in the Buranjis which was taken in 1510 under Suhungmung, the paiks were organized according to families and lineage called phoids and resettled according to their skills. The number of paiks rendering royal service at any time followed the principle of ghar muri e-powa or one-fourth the number of paiks in a household.  The paik rendering service was rotated and the other paiks in his household tended to his gaa mati during his absence.

In the 1609 restructuring by Momai Tamuli Borbarua the phoid organization was replaced by the got.  A got consisted of four paiks who lived close together.  The paiks in a got were numbered mul (first), duwal (second), tewal (third), etc.  In times of peace, generally one of the paiks in a got rendered royal service at any given time. In times of war, a second or even a third paik from a got could be asked to render service simultaneously. As before, the gaa mati was tended to by the remaining paiks of the got. This ensured that economic production did not suffer when a large section of the population was not involved in it and contributed to the resilience of the Ahom kingdom in the 16th to 18th century.

During the time of Rajeswar Singha (1752–1789), as the pressure on the paik system increased, the number of paiks in each got was decreased from four to three.

Organization of the paiks
The paiks in their phoids were organized under khels according to the locality in which they belonged.  Momai Tamuli Borbarua reorganized many such khels functionally according to the specific service the paiks in the khel rendered.  Some of the khels were thus similar to professional or trade guilds.  The organization of the khel was extended later by his son Lachit Borphukan into self contained ones by incorporating paiks of different professions into each khel.Khels were further organized under a mel or a dagi.  A group of such divisions was attached to  each of the three great Gohains, which is then called the hatimur of the particular Gohain.  A second group of divisions was placed under the khel officers (Phukan, Rajkhowa and Barua) that rendered service to members of the royal family.  The third and the largest group of dagis, organized under khel officers, rendered service to the king or the state.

Paik officials
The paiks in a khel were organized under a gradation of officials who commanded a set number of them.  They were Bora (20 paiks), Saikia (100) and Hazarika (1000).  More important khels were commanded by a Phukan (6000), a Rajkhowa (a governor of a territory), or a Barua (a superintending officer) each of whom could command between 2000 and 3000 paiks.

The Phukans, Rajkhowas, Baruas and Hazarikas were nominated by the king and appointed in concurrence with the three great Gohains (Burhagohain, Borgohain and Borpatrogohain). The Boras and Saikias were appointed by their respective Phukans and Rajkhowas. The paiks had the right to reject a Bora or a Saikia and request another officer of their choice.Kanri paiks could rise to become chamua paiks and then to higher paik officials.  Appointments were made irrespective of the paiks religion or ethnicity.

Ahom justice
The Ahom justice system was also based on the Paik system.  Each Paik official offered justice to the paiks and each appeal was heard by the next higher officer in the khel system.  The system of appeals could go right up to the Nyayxodha Phukan.

Challenges to the Paik system
The Paik system was a method by which the Ahom king obtained service from the people and also provided service back to the people.  By the 17th century it had evolved into a robust system that gave the Ahom kingdom a resilience in the face of a long protracted war against the Mughals.  But soon it met challenges.

Over time, the nobles began to appropriate the services of kanri paik, who as a likchou began to work for these high officials instead of the king.  After the end of Ahom-Mughal conflicts, the Ahom kingdom extended the Paik system to the regions earlier held by the Mughals but where the royal service  was now payable in cash, following the pargana system that was left behind.   The increased production of paiks and the growth of an internal market over time in the entire kingdom demanded a monetization of the economy, which the Paik system was unable to handle.  This gave rise to the apaikan chamua a class of paiks who were released from their khels and who paid a cash tax in lieu of the service to the king.  The satras too attracted paiks'' who wanted to escape the compulsory service.  The satras, in addition, came into competition with the Ahom kingdom by expanding into new social groups that the Ahom kingdom would have expanded into otherwise and providing an alternative economic production process.  This conflict with the satras led to the Moamoria rebellion which further weakened the Ahom kingdom.

Notes

References

 
 
 
 
 

Social history of India
Economic history of India
Ahom kingdom